Q57 may refer to:
 Q57 (New York City bus)
 Al-Hadid, a surah of the Quran
 
 Intel Q57, an Intel 5 Series chipset